The Little Shepherd of Kingdom Come is a lost 1928 silent film drama directed by Alfred Santell and starring Richard Barthelmess. It was produced and distributed by First National Pictures.
The film is a remake of a 1920 Goldwyn Pictures film with the same title starring Jack Pickford, also lost.

Cast
Richard Barthelmess as Chad Buford
Molly O'Day as Melissa Turner
Nelson McDowell as Old Joel Turner
Martha Mattox as Maw Turner
Victor Potel as Tom Turner
Mark Hamilton as Dolph Turner
William Bertram as Caleb Haazel
Walter P. Lewis as Old Tad Dillon 
Gardner James as Daws Dillon
Ralph Yearsley as Tad Dillon
Gustav von Seyffertitz as Nathan Cherry
Robert Milasch as The Circuit Rider
Claude Gillingwater as Major Buford
David Torrence as General Dean
Eulalie Jensen as Mrs. Dean

References

External links
The Little Shepherd of Kingdom Come at IMDb.com

lantern slide

1928 films
American silent feature films
Lost American films
American black-and-white films
Films directed by Alfred Santell
First National Pictures films
Silent American drama films
1928 drama films
Films based on American novels
Remakes of American films
1928 lost films
Lost drama films
1920s American films